Group B of the 1999 Fed Cup World Group II Play-offs was one of two pools in the World Group II Play-offs of the 1999 Fed Cup. Four teams competed in a round robin competition, with the top team advancing to the final play-off, the winner of which advancing to the 2000 World Group.

Australia vs. Argentina

Romania vs. Chinese Taipei

Australia vs. Chinese Taipei

Argentina vs. Romania

Australia vs. Romania

Argentina vs. Chinese Taipei

See also
Fed Cup structure

References

External links
 Fed Cup website

World Group II Play-offs Pool B